The Caimito Formation (Tcm) is a geologic formation in Panama. The marls, sandstones and conglomerates preserve bivalve and gastropod fossils dating back to the Late Oligocene to Early Miocene period. The name Caimito was proposed by MacDonald in 1913, named after the Caimito junction in the Panama Railroad during the construction of the Panama Canal.

See also 
 List of fossiliferous stratigraphic units in Panama

References

Bibliography 
 
 

Geologic formations of Panama
Neogene Panama
Marl formations
Siltstone formations
Sandstone formations
Conglomerate formations
Shallow marine deposits
Formations
Formations